The Strudlhofstiege is an outdoor staircase of architectural and literary significance in Vienna, Austria. Located in the Alsergrund district, it is named after a former art school run by the painter Peter Strudel ( – 1714).

History
About 1680 Peter Strudel together with his brother Paul came to Vienna from Cles, Trentino. He settled in the northern suburb where he opened his Strudlhof painting school in 1688, one of the first art colleges in Central Europe. Modelled on the Accademia di San Luca or the Académie royale de peinture et de sculpture in Paris, it was the precursor of the present-day Vienna Academy of Fine Arts. After Strudel's death, however, teaching activities ceased and the Strudlhof was demolished. The present-day Palais Strudlhof, used as a hotel and conference centre, was erected in the late 18th century.

The adjacent street was named Strudlhofgasse in 1907. Shortly afterwards, the Vienna city administration under Mayor Karl Lueger resolved upon the construction of a staircase at the end of the street, in order to create a facilitated access to the lower Lichtental terrain level beyond. The designs were supplied by the architect Theodor Johann Jaeger (1874–1943), an employee at the municipal planning office. Built from luminescent Mannersdorf limestone, it today rates as an Art Nouveau (Jugendstil) masterpiece, resembling the Stadtbahn architecture by Otto Wagner. The stairs were ceremonially opened on 29 November 1910 and since have been restored several times.

The symmetric lower part of the staircase is centered on two fountains, with a facial mask and a fish head as waterspouts. The upper, asymmetric part gives pedestrians varying perspectives while passing by. Metal railings and candelabras create additional highlights. The picturesque construction is a popular setting for open-air choir and concert events.

In 1951 the Austrian author Heimito von Doderer (1896–1966) published his social novel Die Strudlhofstiege oder Melzer und die Tiefe der Jahre (The Strudlhof Steps or Melzer and the Depth of the Years), one of the main works of 20th century Austrian literature. Named after the staircase, around which some central plot points take place, it was filmed several times and adapted as a radio and stage play.

External links 

  wien.gv.at - die Strudlhofstiege
 Heimito von Doderer Society

Buildings and structures in Alsergrund
Buildings and structures completed in 1910
Stairways
Art Nouveau architecture in Vienna
Art Nouveau stairways
1910 establishments in Austria
20th-century architecture in Austria